Simion Florea Marian (1847–1907) was an Austro-Hungarian folklorist and ethnographer of Romanian ethnicity.

He was elected a titular member of the Romanian Academy in 1881.

Notes

External links

1847 births
1907 deaths
Romanian Austro-Hungarians
Romanian folklorists
Romanian ethnographers
Titular members of the Romanian Academy